Campodea monticola is a species of two-pronged bristletail in the family Campodeidae.

Subspecies
These four subspecies belong to the species Campodea monticola:
 Campodea monticola helenae Bareth and Conde, 1958 i c g
 Campodea monticola monticola Conde and Thomas, 1957 i c g
 Campodea monticola obsoleta Conde and Thomas, 1957 i c g
 Campodea monticola pilosa Conde and Thomas, 1957 i c g
Data sources: i = ITIS, c = Catalogue of Life, g = GBIF, b = Bugguide.net

References

Further reading

 
 
 
 
 
 
 
 

Diplura
Animals described in 1957